YoCrunch is a yogurt manufacturer and the creator of yogurt packaged together with crunchy mix-in toppings.

Their dome-topped cups come with yogurt flavors like strawberry, vanilla, and cookies n cream, and mix-ins like M&M's Chocolate Candies, Nestle Crunch candy, Reese's Pieces candy, Oreo cookie pieces, Butterfinger candy, and granola. YoCrunch introduced the YoCrunch Fruit Parfait line in 2010, and the YoCrunch Greek and Greek Parfait lines in 2011. In 2014, YoCrunch introduced the YOPA! line of miniature low-calorie Greek yogurts with M&M's and Dove (chocolate) chocolate toppings.

YoCrunch is currently sold across the United States in six-ounce (170 g) cups and 4-ounce multipacks. It is manufactured in Ft. Worth, Texas.

Company history
Yofarm, YoCrunch's independent parent company, first began making yogurt in 1985, pairing European yogurt recipes with New England's farm-fresh dairy products.

Yofarm introduced YoCrunch, yogurt packaged topped with granola, in 1991. In 1992 it won the "Best New Products — Dairy" and "Best Packaging — Dairy" awards at the Eastern Dairy, Deli, and Bakery Taste Show.

For four years, from 2007–2011, YoCrunch was marketed by Breyers Yogurt Company as Breyers YoCrunch; however, YoCrunch ended this licensing agreement in January 2011.

Healthy Food Holdings, a portfolio company of private equity firm Catterton Partners held the YoCrunch Yogurt Company, LLC from 2005 to 2013.

The company was then sold to Groupe Danone in August 2013.

References

External links 
 Official page

Brand name yogurts
Yogurt companies